Richard Shoebridge (born 12 August 1985 in Johannesburg, South Africa) is a British short track speed skater who competed at the 2014 Winter Olympics.

Shoebridge was part of the British 5,000m relay team that broke the world record in February 2011.

External links
Richard Shoebridge at ISU

References 

1985 births
Living people
British male short track speed skaters
Olympic short track speed skaters of Great Britain
Short track speed skaters at the 2014 Winter Olympics